Joseph Ramotshabi (born 1 June 1962) is a Botswana sprinter. He competed in the 400 metres at the 1980 Summer Olympics and the 1984 Summer Olympics.

References

External links
 

1962 births
Living people
Athletes (track and field) at the 1980 Summer Olympics
Athletes (track and field) at the 1984 Summer Olympics
Athletes (track and field) at the 1988 Summer Olympics
Botswana male sprinters
Botswana male middle-distance runners
Olympic athletes of Botswana
Athletes (track and field) at the 1982 Commonwealth Games
Athletes (track and field) at the 1986 Commonwealth Games
Commonwealth Games competitors for Botswana
Place of birth missing (living people)